Phasianotrochus irisodontes, common name maireener, rainbow kelp shell, or green necklace shell, is a species of sea snail, a marine gastropod mollusk in the family Trochidae, the top snails.

Found off the coast of Tasmania, the shells have been used to make necklaces by Aboriginal Tasmanian women in a cultural practice going back thousands of years. The effects of climate change and human recreational activities have reduced the populations of the snails in recent years.

Description
The height of the shell varies between 10 mm and 20 mm. The pointed, imperforate, solid shell has an elongated conic shape. It is polished, yellowish, pink, or olive-green, with reddish or olive longitudinal lines in pairs, sometimes separate on the body whorl, and usually with numerous narrow, rather obscure spiral pink or yellowish lines. It sometimes has a few series of white dots on the upper part. The conic spire is shorter and less attenuated than in Phasianotrochus bellulus. The about 7 whorls are scarcely convex. The body whorl is not carinate. It is finely striate beneath, and smooth above. The aperture is rather large, often expanded. It is smooth inside, lined with intensely green nacre. The columella is strongly toothed below.

The coloration is quite variable with even unicolored green specimens. The aperture is sometimes so dilated that the spire seems to lean to that side.

Distribution
This marine species is endemic to Australia and occurs in the subtidal and the lower intertidal zone off South Australia, Tasmania, Victoria and Western Australia.

Numbers have been observed to have been decreasing in recent years, with the causes put down to recreational activities reducing the amount of kelp habitat, predatory fish attracted by excess feed escaping from abalone farms, and storms eroding the seabed.

Shell necklaces 
Tasmanian Aboriginal women have been making shell necklaces from the maireener shells for at least 2,600 years, with some major collections in museums. The continuation of the practice is being threatened by reducing supply, and 6th-generation Palawa woman Lola Greeno is concerned that the practice will die out.

References

 Menke, C.T. 1843. Molluscorum Novae Hollandiae Specimen in Libraria Aulica Hahniana. Hannover : Hahniana 46 pp. 
 Philippi, R.A. 1845. Abbildungen und Beschriebungen neuer oder wenig gekannter Conchylien. Cassel : Theodor Fischer Vol. 2 64 pp.
 Philippi, R.A. 1850. Trochidae. pp. 121–136 in Küster, H.C. (ed). Systematisches Conchylien-Cabinet von Martini und Chemnitz. Nürnberg : Bauer & Raspe Vol. II.
 Adams, A. 1853. Contributions towards a monograph of the Trochidae, a family of gastropodous Mollusca. Proceedings of the Zoological Society of London 1851(19): 150-192
 Angas, G.F. 1865. On the marine molluscan fauna of the Province of South Australia, with a list of all the species known up to the present time, together with remarks on their habitats and distribution, etc. Proceedings of the Zoological Society of London 1865: 155-"180"
 Tenison-Woods, J.E. 1879. Census; with brief descriptions of the marine shells of Tasmania and the adjacent islands. Proceedings of the Royal Society of Tasmania 1877: 26-57
 Pritchard, G.B. & Gatliff, J.H. 1902. Catalogue of the marine shells of Victoria. Part V. Proceedings of the Royal Society of Victoria 14(2): 85-138
 Torr, C.M. 1914. Radula of some South Australian Gasteropoda. Transactions of the Royal Society of South Australia 38: 362-368 
 Mawle, E. 1918. Notes on the kelp shell, Cantharidus irisodontes. The Australian Zoologist 1: 161-162
 Gatliff, J.H. & Gabriel, C.J. 1922. Additions to and alterations in the Catalogue of Victorian Marine Mollusca. Proceedings of the Royal Society of Victoria n.s. 34(2): 128-161
 Allan, J.K. 1950. Australian Shells: with related animals living in the sea, in freshwater and on the land. Melbourne : Georgian House xix, 470 pp., 45 pls, 112 text figs.
 Cotton, B.C. 1959. South Australian Mollusca. Archaeogastropoda. Handbook of the Flora and Fauna of South Australia. Adelaide : South Australian Government Printer 449 pp. 
 Wilson, B. 1993. Australian Marine Shells. Prosobranch Gastropods. Kallaroo, Western Australia : Odyssey Publishing Vol. 1 408 pp.
 Hickman C.S. (2005) Seagrass fauna of the temperate southern coast of Australia I: The cantharidine trochid gastropods. In: F.E. Wells, D.I. Walker & G.A. Kendrick (eds), The marine flora and fauna of Esperance, Western Australia: 199-220. Western Australian Museum, Perth
 Grove, S. 2011. The Seashells of Tasmania: A Comprehensive Guide. Taroona, Australia: Taroona Publications. [vi], 81

External links
 To Barcode of Life (1 barcode)
 To Biodiversity Heritage Library (6 publications)
 To GenBank (3 nucleotides; 1 proteins)
 To World Register of Marine Species

irisodontes
Gastropods of Australia
Gastropods described in 1834